Cuba competed at the 1972 Summer Olympics in Munich, West Germany. 137 competitors, 109 men and 28 women, took part in 69 events in 14 sports.

Medalists

Athletics

Men's 100 metres
Hermes Ramírez
 First Heat — DNS (→ did not advance)
Pablo Montes
 First Heat — DNS (→ did not advance)

Men's High Jump
Irolan Hechavarria
 Qualification Round — DNS (→ did not advance)

Men's 4 × 100 m Relay
José Triana, Juan Morales, Hermes Ramírez, and Pablo Montes
 Heat — 39.65s 
 Semifinals — 39.04s (→ did not advance)

Basketball

Boxing

Men's Welterweight (– 67 kg)
 Emilio Correa →  Gold Medal
 First round — Bye
 Second round — defeated , 5:0
 Third round — defeated , TKO-2 
 Quarterfinals — defeated , 3:2 
 Semifinals — defeated , 3:2 
 Final — defeated , 5:0

Men's Light Middleweight (– 71 kg)
Rolando Garbey
 First round — defeated , 5:0 
 Second round — defeated , 5:0 
 Third round — defeated , TKO-2 

Men's Heavyweight (+ 81 kg)
Teófilo Stevenson →  Gold Medal
 First round — defeated , TKO-1 
 Quarterfinals — defeated , TKO-3 
 Semifinals — defeated , TKO-2
 Final — defeated , walk-over

Canoeing

Cycling

Six cyclists represented Cuba in 1972.

Individual road race
 Gregorio Aldo Arencibia — 75th place
 Raúl Marcelo Vázquez — did not finish (→ no ranking)
 José Prieto — did not finish (→ no ranking)
 Pedro Rodríguez — did not finish (→ no ranking)

Team time trial
 Gregorio Aldo Arencibia
 Roberto Menéndez
 Pedro Rodríguez
 Raúl Marcelo Vázquez

Individual pursuit
 Roberto Heredero

Team pursuit
 Gregorio Aldo Arencibia
 Roberto Heredero
 Roberto Menéndez
 Raúl Marcelo Vázquez

Fencing

15 fencers, 10 men and 5 women, represented Cuba in 1972.

Men's foil
 Eduardo Jhons
 Jesús Gil
 Enrique Salvat

Men's team foil
 Evelio González, Eduardo Jhons, Jesús Gil, Enrique Salvat, Jorge Garbey

Men's sabre
 Manuel Ortíz
 Guzman Salazar
 Francisco de la Torre

Men's team sabre
 Hilario Hipólito, Guzman Salazar, Francisco de la Torre, Manuel Ortíz, Manuel Suárez

Women's foil
 Margarita Rodríguez
 Marlene Infante
 María Esther García

Women's team foil
 Irene Forbes, María Esther García, Marlene Infante, Margarita Rodríguez, Nereida Rodríguez

Gymnastics

Judo

Men's Lightweight
Héctor Rodríguez

Men's Middleweight
Isaac Azcuy

Men's Half-Heavyweight
José Ibañez

Rowing

Men's Coxed Pairs
Lázaro Rivero, Teófilo Lores and Jesús Rosello
Heat — 8:17.34
Repechage — 8:37.14 (→ did not advance)

Men's Coxless Fours
Eralio Cabrera, Troadio Delgado, Ramón Luperón, and Angel Serra

Shooting

Eight male shooters represented Cuba in 1972.

25 m pistol
 Arturo Costa

50 m pistol
 Santiago Trompeta

300 m rifle, three positions
 Miguel Valdes

50 m rifle, three positions
 Miguel Valdes
 Raúl Llanos

50 m rifle, prone
 Humberto Cabrera
 Adelso Peña

Skeet
 Roberto Castrillo
 Servilio Torres

Volleyball

Men's Team Competition
Preliminary Round (Group B)
 Lost to East Germany (0-3)
 Lost to Japan (0-3)
 Defeated West Germany (3-2)
 Lost to Romania (0-3)
 Defeated Brazil (3-2)
Classification Match
 9th/10th place: Lost to Poland (0-3) → Tenth place
Team Roster
Alfredo Figueredo
Antonio Rodríguez 
Carlos Dilaut
Diego Lapera 
Enrique Fortes
Ernesto Martínez  
Jorge Pérez Vento 
Lorenzo Martínez 
Luis Calderon 
Luis Jiménez
Orlando Samuell
Pedro Delgado

Water polo

Weightlifting

Wrestling

References

External links
Official Olympic Reports
International Olympic Committee results database

Nations at the 1972 Summer Olympics
1972
1972 in Cuban sport